From 1917 to 1919, a large strike movement shook the First Brazilian Republic, concentrated in São Paolo and Rio de Janeiro. It culminated in several general strikes in 1917 and an attempted anarchist uprising in November 1918. The 1917 general strike is considered the first general strike in the labor history of Brazil, and marks the beginning of the period known as the five red years (quinquennio rosso).

The 1917 strike began in São Paolo in July, after the murder by police of a young cobbler, Antonio Martinez, and was marked by violent clashes between the workers and the security forces for four days. Ongoing repression of workers in Rio de Janeiro, coupled with the deaths of dozens of workers in a building collapse, led to the strike spreading there later the same month, after a decision by the Rio de Janeiro Workers Federation (Federação Operária do Rio de Janeiro - FORJ). The FORJ was banned not long after.

The unrest continued in 1918, which saw accelerated union recruitment and some soldiers defecting to the workers, as well as protests against the conscription brought about by World War I. The General Workers Union (União Geral dos Trabalhadores - UGT) was established on March 1, to replace the banned FORJ. The Spanish flu epidemic the same year took its toll on the workers, many of whom were already weakened by hunger. 

The unrest culminated in the 1918 Rio de Janeiro anarchist insurrection in November. Some of the soldiers who had joined the workers betrayed their plans for insurrection to the authorities, and there was a mass round-up in November, as well as assassinations of some leaders by police. The UGT was in turn banned by the authorities, and many other unions repressed. Thereafter, the government combined repressive anti-union legislation with aggressive policing to prevent the formation of free unions.

See also 

 1978-1980 ABC Paulista strikes

References

Further reading 

:pt:Insurreição anarquista de 1918

1910s in Brazil
1917 labor disputes and strikes
1918 labor disputes and strikes
1919 labor disputes and strikes
First Brazilian Republic
General strikes
Brazil strike movement, 1917-1919
Labour disputes in Brazil
Rebellions in Brazil